Nine Provinces (Japanese and Chinese: 九州) may refer to:
Nine Provinces (China), territorial divisions during Xia and Shang Dynasty China.
Kyūshū, an island of Japan.